In 2012 Shelbourne F.C. competed in the League of Ireland Premier Division. Shelbourne finished the season in 8th position and reached the semi-finals of the 2012 FAI Cup. The 2012 season marked the first time Shelbourne competed in the Premier Division since 2006, when as champions, they were demoted due to financial issues. Shelbourne gained promotion by finishing 2nd in the 2011 League of Ireland First Division.

Commercial partners

Staff

First team coaching and medical staff

First team squad 2012

A total of 23 players represented Shelbourne at various stages during the 2012 season.

 (Vice-captain)

 (Captain)

Post-2011 season

Transfers in

As of 6 July 2012.

Transfers out

As of 1 August 2012.

2012 fixtures and results

League of Ireland Premier Division

Expunged league result

League of Ireland Premier Division table

League results summary

League form/results by round
Home ground: Tolka Park

FAI Cup

League of Ireland Cup

Leinster Senior Cup

Friendlies

2012 season statistics
As of 20 October 2012.

Player appearances/goals

|}

Top goalscorers

See also
2012 League of Ireland

References

Shelbourne F.C. seasons
Shelbourne